Al Assad University Hospital in Damascus is one of the largest teaching hospitals in Syria. It was founded in 1988 and is run by the Ministry of Higher Education. The hospital is affiliated with Damascus University.

Facilities
The hospital has facilities for MRI and CT scan, a gamma camera and lithotripsy device. The operations ward contains 11 operation rooms suitable for laparoscopic and open heart surgery as well as computerized neurosurgery. Analyses performed by the hospital lab include hormonal, immune, tumor, pharmaceutical, and lymphatic tests/ It has a stem cell bank. The hospital provides medical, therapeutic and surgical services to patients. It is used to train students and graduate doctors from Syrian universities and contributes to scientific research. Hospital activities include internal specialties, including cardiac, neurological, gastrointestinal and kidney. It also performs general, endoscopic, vascular and cardiac surgery, neurosurgery and urosurgery. It has a kidney transplant unit and a physiotherapy unit.

The hospital contains 645 beds, 36 of which are for intensive care, and has a special emergency ward for internal diseases.

See also
 Faculty of Medicine of Damascus University

References

Hospital buildings completed in 1988
Hospitals established in 1988
Hospitals in Syria
Medical education in Syria
Teaching hospitals
1988 establishments in Syria
Damascus University
Buildings and structures in Damascus